Yuri Vasilyevich Morozov (6 March 1948 – 23 February 2006), was a Russian rock Multi-instrumentalist, sound engineer and composer.  He created his own style using Progressive rock, Psychedelic rock, Experimental music, Folk music, Jazz and many more.  Besides having his own musical career, he also participated in the recording of albums of bands such as DDT, Aquarium, Chizh & Co, and many others.

References

External links 
About him at lib.ru  (in Russian) 
Biography  (in Russian) 

1948 births
2006 deaths
Russian audio engineers
Russian experimental musicians
Russian multi-instrumentalists
Russian rock singers
Soviet male singers
20th-century Russian male singers
20th-century Russian singers
Burials at Serafimovskoe Cemetery